General elections were held in Montserrat on 31 May 2006. Although the Movement for Change and Prosperity (MCAP) won the most seats (four of the nine) in the Legislative Council, the government was formed by a coalition of the Montserrat Democratic Party (MDP), the New People's Liberation Movement (NPLM) and an independent council member, who together held five seats. MDP leader Lowell Lewis became Chief Minister.

Campaign
A total of 29 candidates contested the elections; the MCAP ran a full slate of nine candidates and the MDP and NPLM both nominated eight. The remaining four candidates were independents.

Results

References

Elections in Montserrat
Montserrat
General election
Montserrat
Election and referendum articles with incomplete results
May 2006 events in North America